Fung King Cheong (born 19 February 1907) was a Chinese professional footballer who played at the 1936 and 1948 Olympics. Fung spent his career in Guangzhou, China and Hong Kong. After the Chinese civil war, Fung remained in Hong Kong and never returned to mainland China to play or coach.

Club career
Fung had played for South China in 1932–33 season. The team was split in to A and B teams in the 1930s, and Fung belonged to South China "A". Fung retired in 1949.

International career

China
Fung represented China in two Olympics and was the only Chinese footballer to achieve that. However, he was an unused player in the 1948 edition. Lee Wai Tong, teammate of the 1936 edition (and in South China), selected Fung for the 1948 edition. Fung also played in the 1934 Far Eastern Championship Games, as well as a friendly tournament against Portugal in April 1935.

Hong Kong (unofficial)
Fung also represented "Hong Kong Chinese", an unofficial feeder team of China against "Great Britain (Hong Kong) military representative team" in January 1933, as a charity match for the Tung Wah Group of Hospitals. Fung scored a brace to win 2–0. Fung also scored for the team against the Navy in a competition in 1936, in which "Hong Kong Chinese" was the winner.

He also represented Hong Kong in the Hong Kong–Shanghai Interport in 1935 and 1937. The teams were not members of FIFA. In the 1937 match, the Hong Kong team was composed of ethnic Chinese including Fung and Lee as well as Western expatriates, while Shanghai was composed of Western expatriates only.

In 1949, along with his "China" and South China teammate Chang King Hai and Hau Yung Sang, he was selected by Hong Kong against Saigon in the 1949 Hong Kong–Vietnam Interport. However, as Hong Kong only became a member of FIFA after 1954, while Saigon was never a member, this match was not official either.

Coaching career

Personal life
Fung's sons were footballers, namely Fung Kee Wan, .

Kee Wan represented Hong Kong in the 1960 Pestabola Merdeka and 1964 AFC Asian Cup.

 was married to a daughter of fellow footballer and coach Hsu King Shing.

References

External links
 

Chinese footballers
China international footballers
Hong Kong footballers
Hong Kong international footballers
South China AA players
Hong Kong First Division League players
Olympic footballers of China
Footballers at the 1936 Summer Olympics
Footballers at the 1948 Summer Olympics
Dual internationalists (football)
1907 births
Year of death missing
Association football defenders